Knowledge transfer is the sharing or disseminating of knowledge and the providing of inputs to problem solving. In organizational theory, knowledge transfer is the practical problem of transferring knowledge from one part of the organization to another. Like knowledge management, knowledge transfer seeks to organize, create, capture or distribute knowledge and ensure its availability for future users. It is considered to be more than just a communication problem. If it were merely that, then a memorandum, an e-mail or a meeting would accomplish the knowledge transfer. Knowledge transfer is more complex because:

 knowledge resides in organizational members, tools, tasks, and their subnetworks and 
 much knowledge in organizations is tacit or hard to articulate.

The subject has been taken up under the title of knowledge management since the 1990s. The term has also been applied to the transfer of knowledge at the international level.

In business, knowledge transfer now has become a common topic in mergers and acquisitions. It focuses on transferring technological platform, market experience, managerial expertise, corporate culture, and other intellectual capital that can improve the companies' competence. Since technical skills and knowledge are very important assets for firms' competence in the global competition, unsuccessful knowledge transfer can have a negative impact on corporations and lead to the expensive and time-consuming M&A not creating values to the firms.

History 
Knowledge transfer between humans is a practice that likely dates back to the "Great Leap Forward" in behavioral modernity about 80,000 years ago, with the origin of speech initiating as far back as 100,000 BCE. Many scholars agree that modern human behavior can be characterized by abstract thinking, planning depth, symbolic behavior (e.g., art, ornamentation), music and dance, exploitation of large game, and blade technology, among others - "a set of traits that have come to be accepted as indicators of behavioral modernity" 

The evolution of knowledge transfer from this prehistoric period can arguably be broken up into two key developments: speech and symbols.

Speech 
A distinction can be drawn between speech and language. Language is not necessarily spoken: it might alternatively be written or signed. Speech is among a number of different methods of encoding and transmitting linguistic information, albeit arguably the most natural one. Language users have high-level reference (or deixis), the ability to refer to things or states of being that are not in the immediate realm of the speaker. This ability is often related to theory of mind, or an awareness of the other as a being like the self with individual wants and intentions.

Langugage may initially have been a cognitive development, with its "externalisation" to serving communicative purposes occurring later in human evolution. According to one such school of thought, the key feature distinguishing human language is recursion, (in this context, the iterative embedding of phrases within phrases). Other scholars—notably Daniel Everett—deny that recursion is universal, citing certain languages (e.g. Pirahã) which allegedly lack this feature.

Symbols 
The oldest known cave painting is located within Chauvet Cave, dated to around 30,000 BC. These paintings contained increasing amounts of information: people may have created the first calendar as far back as 15,000 years ago. The connection between drawing and writing is further shown by linguistics: in Ancient Egypt and Ancient Greece the concepts and words of drawing and writing were the same (Egyptian: 's-sh', Greek: 'graphein').

Modern knowledge transfer 
Argote & Ingram (2000) define knowledge transfer as "the process through which one unit (e.g., group, department, or division) is affected by the experience of another" (p. 151). They further point out the transfer of organizational knowledge (i.e., routine or best practices) can be observed through changes in the knowledge or performance of recipient units. Even though the benefits of knowledge transfer are well known, the effectiveness of the process varies considerably.  The transfer of organizational knowledge, such as best practices, can be quite difficult to achieve.

Szulanski's doctoral dissertation ("Exploring internal stickiness: Impediments to the transfer of best practice within the firm") proposed that knowledge transfer within a firm is inhibited by factors other than a lack of incentive. How well knowledge about best practices remains broadly accessible within a firm depends upon the nature of that knowledge, from where (or whom) it comes, who gets it, and the organizational context within which any transfer occurs. "Stickiness" is a metaphor that comes from the difficulty of circulating fluid around an oil refinery (including effects of the fluid's native viscosity). It is worth noting that his analysis does not apply to scientific theories, where a different set of dynamics and rewards apply.

Three related concepts are "knowledge utilization", "research utilization" and "implementation", which are used in the health sciences to describe the process of bringing a new idea, practice or technology into consistent and appropriate use in a clinical setting. The study of knowledge utilization/implementation (KU/I) is a direct outgrowth of the movement toward evidence-based medicine and research concluding that health care practices with demonstrated efficacy are not consistently used in practice settings.

Knowledge transfer within organisations and between nations also raises ethical considerations particularly where there is an imbalance in power relationships (e.g. employer and employee) or in the levels of relative need for knowledge resources (such as developed and developing worlds).

Knowledge transfer includes, but encompasses more than, technology transfer.

Knowledge transfer mechanisms 
Two kinds of knowledge transfer mechanisms have been noticed in practice: Personalization and Codification.  Personalization refers to the one-to-one transfer of [knowledge] between two entities in person.  A very good example of this is the act of teaching a person how to ride a bicycle.  On the other hand, codification refers to the act of converting knowledge into knowledge artifacts such as documents, images and videos that are consumed by the knowledge recipients asynchronously. Codification can also be described as a process of defining an idea into an object. 

Personalized knowledge transfer results in better assimilation of knowledge by the recipient when knowledge tacitness is higher and/or when information content in a knowledge object is high.  On the other hand, codification is driven by the need to transfer knowledge to large number of people and results in better knowledge reuse.  Entropy of the knowledge objects can provide a measure of their information content or tacitness.

Argote & Ingram (2000) argue, that embedding knowledge in technology has been proved to be an effective way of transferring knowledge.

Subtypes of knowledge transfer 

Based on the number of sources and recipients, all types of knowledge transfer can be reduced to 3 subtypes, namely: linear, divergent, and convergent. Linear Knowledge Transfer occurs when there is one source and one recipient ( e.g. when one person explains a specific topic to someone else). Divergent Knowledge Transfer occurs when there is one source and multiple recipients (e.g. when a team leader outlines specific tasks for the team). Convergent Knowledge Transfer occurs when one recipient acquires information from different sources. A typical example of  Convergent Knowledge Transfer is when a patient receives information about a condition from several doctors.  Convergent Knowledge Transfer is especially efficient in producing in-depth knowledge of a specific topic.

Between public and private domains 
With the move of advanced economies from a resource-based to a knowledge-based production, many national governments have increasingly recognized "knowledge" and "innovation" as significant driving forces of economic growth, social development, and job creation. In this context the promotion of 'knowledge transfer' has increasingly become a subject of public and economic policy. However, the long list of changing global, national and regional government programmes indicates the tension between the need to conduct 'free' research – that is motivated by interest and by private sector 'short term' objectives – and research for public interests and general common good.

The underlying assumption that there is a potential for increased collaboration between industry and universities is also underlined in much of the current innovation literature.  In particular the Open Innovation approach to developing business value is explicitly based on an assumption that Universities are a "vital source for accessing external ideas". Moreover, Universities have been deemed to be "the great, largely unknown, and certainly underexploited, resource contributing to the creation of wealth and economic competitiveness."

Universities and other public sector research organisations (PSROs) have accumulated much practical experience over the years in the transfer of knowledge across the divide between the domains of publicly produced knowledge and the private exploitation of it. Many colleges and PSROs have developed processes and policies to discover, protect and exploit intellectual property (IP) rights, and to ensure that IP is successfully transferred to private corporations, or vested in new companies formed for the purposes of exploitation. Routes to commercialization of IP produced by PSROs and colleges include licensing, joint venture, new company formation and royalty-based assignments.

Organisations such as AUTM in the US, the Institute of Knowledge Transfer in the UK, SNITTS in Sweden and the Association of European Science and Technology Transfer Professionals in Europe have provided a conduit for knowledge transfer professionals across the public and private sectors to identify best practice and develop effective tools and techniques for the management of PSRO/college produced IP. On-line Communities of Practice for knowledge transfer practitioners are also emerging to facilitate connectivity (such as The Global Innovation Network and the knowledge Pool).

Business-University Collaboration was the subject of the Lambert Review in the UK in 2003.

Neuro-education seeks to improve quality of didactic methods and reduce the so called research practice gap.

In the knowledge economy

With the production factors of the knowledge economy having broadly reshaped and supplanted those of prior economic models, researchers have characterized the management and processing of organizational knowledge as vital to organizational success, with knowledge transfer in particular playing a key role in the practice of technology sharing, personnel transfers, and strategic integration.

Knowledge transfer can also be achieved through investment programme, both intentionally and unintentionally in the form of skills, technology, and ‘tacit knowledge’ including management and organisational practices.  For example, foreign investment in African countries have shown to provide some knowledge transfer.

In landscape ecology
By knowledge transfer in landscape ecology, means a group of activities that increase the understanding of landscape ecology with the goal of encouraging application of this knowledge. Five factors will influence knowledge transfer from the view of forest landscape ecology: the generation of research capacity, the potential for application, the users of the knowledge, the infrastructure capacity, and the process by which knowledge is transferred (Turner, 2006).

Types of knowledge 

Knowledge is a dominant feature in our post-industrial society, and knowledge workers are important in many enterprises. Blackler expands on a categorization of knowledge types that were suggested by Collins (1993):

 Embrained knowledge is that which is dependent on conceptual skills and cognitive abilities. We could consider this to be practical, high-level knowledge, where objectives are met through perpetual recognition and revamping. Tacit knowledge may also be embrained, even though it is mainly subconscious.
 Embodied knowledge is action oriented and consists of contextual practices. It is more of a social acquisition, as how individuals interact in and interpret their environment creates this non-explicit type of knowledge.
 Encultured  knowledge is the process of achieving shared understandings through socialization and acculturation. Language and negotiation become the discourse of this type of knowledge in an enterprise.
 Embedded knowledge is tacit and resides within systematic routines. It relates to the relationships between roles, technologies, formal procedures and emergent routines within a complex system. In order to initiate any specific line of business knowledge transition helps a lot.
 Encoded knowledge is information that is conveyed in signs and symbols (books, manuals, data bases, etc.) and decontextualized into codes of practice. Rather than being a specific type of knowledge, it deals more with the transmission, storage and interrogation of knowledge.

Knowledge transfer platforms 
A recent trend is the development of online platforms aiming to optimize knowledge transfer and collaboration.

Knowledge transfer unit 
The transfer of knowledge can be viewed as the transmission of a chain of small, interchangeable, semantic units. A Knowledge Transfer Unit was defined as the smallest amount of information that can be accurately communicated.

Challenges 
Factors that complicate knowledge transfer include:
 The inability to recognize & articulate "compiled" or highly intuitive competencies - tacit knowledge idea
 Different views on explicitness of knowledge 
 Geography or distance
 Limitations of Information and Communication Technologies (ICTs)
 Lack of a shared/superordinate social identity
 Language
 Areas of expertise
 Internal conflicts (for example, professional territoriality)
 Generational differences
 Union-management relations
 Incentives
 Problems with sharing beliefs, assumptions, heuristics and cultural norms.
 The use of visual representations to transfer knowledge (Knowledge visualization)
 Previous exposure or experience with something
 Misconceptions
 Faulty information
 Organizational culture non-conducive to knowledge sharing (the "Knowledge is power" culture)
 Motivational issues, such as resistance to change and power struggles 
 Lack of trust
 Capabilities of the receptor to interpret and absorb knowledge 
 Context of the knowledge (tacit, context-specific knowledge) 
 Inability to detect the opportunity of knowledge sharing

Everett Rogers pioneered diffusion of innovations theory, presenting a research-based model for how and why individuals and social networks adopt new ideas, practices and products. In anthropology, the concept of diffusion also explores the spread of ideas among cultures.

Process 
 Identifying the knowledge holders within the organization
 Motivating them to share
 Designing a sharing mechanism to facilitate the transfer
 Executing the transfer plan
 Measuring to ensure the transfer
 Applying the knowledge transferred
 Monitoring and evaluating

Practices 
 Mentorship
 Guided experience
 Simulation
 Guided experimentation
 Work shadowing
 Paired work
 Community of practice
 Narrative transfer
 Practices

Incorrect usage 
Knowledge transfer is often used as a synonym for training. Furthermore, information should not be confused with knowledge, nor is it, strictly speaking, possible to "transfer" experiential knowledge to other people. Information might be thought of as facts or understood data; however, knowledge has to do with flexible and adaptable skills—a person's unique ability to wield and apply information. This fluency of application is in part what differentiates information from knowledge. Knowledge tends to be both tacit and personal; the knowledge one person has is difficult to quantify, store, and retrieve for someone else to use.

Knowledge transfer (KT) and knowledge sharing (KS) are sometimes used interchangeably or are considered to share common features. Since some knowledge management researchers assume that these two concepts are rather similar and have overlapping content, there is often confusion, especially among researchers and practitioners, about what a certain concept means. For this reason, terms such as KS and KT get used incorrectly without any respect to their real meaning and these meanings can change from paper to paper.

See also 

 Ignorance management
 Institutional memory
 Instructional theory
 Knowledge management
 Knowledge tagging
 Knowledge translation
 Communities of practice
 Technology brokering
 Technology transfer
 Transfer of learning
 Value presentation
 Media richness theory
 Customer knowledge
 Industrial knowledge theft
 Information society
 Explicit knowledge

References

Further reading
 
 Argote, L. et al. (2000). "Knowledge Transfer in Organizations: Learning from the Experience of Others", Organizational Behavior and Human Decision Processes, 82(1) (May): 1–8
 Castells, M. (1996). Conclusion, The Rise of the Network Society. The Information Age: Economy, Society & Culture, Volume 1. (pp. 469–478). Oxford: Blackwell
 Leonard, D.; and Swap, W. (2005) Deep Smarts: How to cultivate and transfer enduring business wisdom, HBSP. 
 Lipphardt, Veronika / Ludwig, David: Knowledge Transfer and Science Transfer, European History Online, Mainz: Institute of European History, 2011, retrieved: January 11, 2012
 Shaw, M. (2001). "Integrating Learning Technologies: The social-cultural, pragmatic and technology design contexts", Teaching and Learning with Technology, (6)
 Trautman, Steve (2006). "Teach What You Know: A Practical Leader's Guide to Knowledge Transfer", Addison-Wesley
 Davenport, Thomas H.; and Prusak, Laurence (2000). Working Knowledge: How Organizations Manage What They Know, Boston Massachusetts, Harvard Business School Press
 Turner, (2006). Knowledge Transfer in Forest Landscape Ecology: A Primer. In: Forest landscape ecology, transferring knowledge to practice. Perera. A.H., Buse, L.J. and Crow, T.R. (Eds),  New York, Springer, 1–2.

External links 
 Project of knowledge transfer of the CIPRA "Future in the Alps"
 "Knowledge Transfer Study – 2 Year study project for the European Commission"

 
Educational psychology
Information society